Living With A Tiger is a 2009 studio album by Acoustic Ladyland.

Track listing 
All songs by Acoustic Ladyland.

 "Sport Mode"
 "Glasto"
 "Living With A Tiger"
 "Gratitude"
 "Have Another Go"
 "Death By Platitude"
 "Not So"
 "The Mighty Q"
 "Worry"
 "You And I"

Personnel
 Pete Wareham - tenor saxophone
 Chris Sharkey - guitar
 Ruth Goller - bass guitar
 Sebastian Rochford - drums

2009 albums
Acoustic Ladyland albums